Nikhil Mohan Pattnaik is an Indian scholar, scientist, and science author. He obtained a PhD from the University of Chicago in Biochemistry.

Early life 
Pattnaik was born in Cuttack in the Indian state of Odisha.

Marriages 
Pattnaik was married to Pushpashree Pattnaik.

Academic career 
Pattnaik obtained Master of Science (Chemistry) from Indian Institute of Technology, Kanpur, in 1971 and PhD (Biochemistry) from University of Chicago, Illinois, USA, in 1976.

Travel to United States in 1970s
Pattnaik traveled to Chicago for research at the University of Chicago. He worked with activity-based science education and extracurricular science activities with studies and research in political realism, youth based scientific research, and building science related educational systems. He worked as a Biochemistry research scientist until 1991.

Return to Odisha 
In 1983 Pattnaik returned to Odisha and he started working with Eklavya foundation and Kerala Sastra Sahitya Parishad. He launched "Bharat Gyan Bigyan Jatra", a campaign with the theme 'people's science' using folk art as the medium to simplify science.

Foundation of Srujanika 

In 1983 Pattnaik founded Srujanika, a science education and research non-profit in Bhubaneswar. The philosophy behind Srujanika's work has been "learning with things around" which promotes science activities for children with readily available material. Groups involved in the "Bharat Gyan Bigyan Jatra" campaign started a science journal "Bigyana Taranga". In 2004 Pattnaik supported "Project Rebati" at Srujanika for creating awareness for Linux and Open Source software, and Oriya language localization. Pattnaik also initiated the project "Open Access to Oriya Books", building low-cost tools for digitizing old Oriya books and periodicals, and open source processing software in collaboration with National Institute of Technology, Rourkela and Pragati Utkal Sangh. This project resulted in digitizing the Purnachandra Ordiya Bhashakosha, a seven-volume, 9,500-page, four-language lexicon compiled by Gopala Chandra Praharaj. In addition to the digitization of other 1,300,000 pages from sixty-one old and rare magazines and editions of fourteen newspapers published between 1850 and 1950, Oriya dictionaries published between 1811 and 1942 were digitized and compiled as the three-volume collection "Odia Bhasa Sadhana". Pattnaik has authored the Oriya adaptation of The Man Who Knew Infinity on the life and work of Indian mathematician Srinivas Ramanujan.

Publications
Pattnaik has authored several technical papers, compilations, and one guidebook.

References

External links

People from Cuttack
Scientists from Odisha
Indian science fiction writers
IIT Kanpur alumni
Articles containing video clips
Year of birth missing (living people)
Living people
University of Chicago alumni